Eliezer Shostak (born 16 December 1911, died 20 August 2001) was an Israeli politician who served as Minister of Health from 1977 until 1984 and as a member of the Knesset from 1951 until 1988.

Biography
Eliezer Shostak as born in Volodymyrets in the Russian Empire (today in Ukraine). He joined the Betar movement in 1930 and made aliyah to Mandatory Palestine in 1935, joining the Betar work battalion in Herzliya.

Political career
In 1936, Shostak was elected secretary of the National Workers Labour Federation. He became a member of the central committee of Hatzohar and sat on the movement's national executive. He was placed third on the Hatzohar list for the 1949 elections, but the party failed to win a seat.

Shostak later joined Menachem Begin's Herut movement, and was placed ninth on the Herut list for the 1951 elections, but missed out on a seat when the party won only eight seats. However, he entered the Knesset as a replacement for Ya'akov Meridor in November 1951. He was re-elected in 1955, 1959, 1961 and 1965. During the Herut convention in 1966 he and Shmuel Tamir constituted the major opposition to Begin's leadership of the party, and the following year he and three other Herut MKs left the party to form the Free Centre. He was re-elected again in 1969, and in 1973 the Free Centre allied with Herut and the Liberal Party to form Likud, for whom he was elected to the Knesset in the elections that year. In 1975, the Free Centre split and Shostak became chairman of the Independent Centre faction.

He was re-elected again in 1977 and was appointed Minister of Health in Begin's government. He retained the role following the 1981 elections, but was left out of the cabinet after the 1984 elections, instead becoming Deputy Speaker of the Knesset. He lost his seat in 1988, having served in the Knesset for just over 37 years.

References

External links

1911 births
2001 deaths
Betar members
Deputy Speakers of the Knesset
Free Centre politicians
Gahal politicians
Hatzohar politicians
Herut politicians
Israeli people of Ukrainian-Jewish descent
Jewish Israeli politicians
Likud politicians
Members of the 2nd Knesset (1951–1955)
Members of the 3rd Knesset (1955–1959)
Members of the 4th Knesset (1959–1961)
Members of the 5th Knesset (1961–1965)
Members of the 6th Knesset (1965–1969)
Members of the 7th Knesset (1969–1974)
Members of the 8th Knesset (1974–1977)
Members of the 9th Knesset (1977–1981)
Members of the 10th Knesset (1981–1984)
Members of the 11th Knesset (1984–1988)
Ministers of Health of Israel
People from Rivne Oblast
People from Volhynian Governorate
Ukrainian Jews
La'am politicians
Burials at Nahalat Yitzhak Cemetery
Soviet emigrants to Mandatory Palestine